Anthidium venustum is a species of bee in the family Megachilidae, the leaf-cutter, carder, or mason bees.

Synonyms
Synonyms for this species include:
Anthidium morawitzii Dalla Torre, 1896

References

venustum
Insects described in 1878